Pterengraulis atherinoides, the wingfin anchovy is a species of anchovy which is found along the Atlantic coast of South America from the Orinoco Delta to Ceará, Brazil.  It is the only species in its genus.

References

Monotypic ray-finned fish genera
Anchovies
Taxa named by Albert Günther
Fish of South America